Dalton Arthur Bales (February 21, 1920 – October 30, 1979) was a politician in Ontario, Canada. He was a Progressive Conservative member of the Legislative Assembly of Ontario from 1963 to 1975 who represented the riding of York Mills. He was a cabinet minister in the governments of John Robarts and Bill Davis.

Background
Bales joined the Toronto law firm of McLaughlin, Soward in 1946 while he was a law student. He was called to the bar in 1949 and eventually became partner.

Politics
He entered politics in 1958 by being elected to the North York Town Council as an alderman. He defeated Paul Graham in Ward 2 by 780 votes. He was re-elected in 1960.

In 1963, he ran as the Progressive Conservative candidate in the riding of  York Mills. He defeated Liberal James Service by 8,434 votes. He was a major organizer in the Toronto area where the party won 22 seats. He was re-elected in 1967 and 1971.

In 1966 he was appointed Minister of Labour in the government of Premier John Robarts. In 1971, Bill Davis appointed him Minister of Municipal Affairs. In 1972 he was promoted to Attorney General of Ontario.

In 1972, Bales and several other cabinet ministers were accused of being in a conflict of interest over property they owned. In Bales' case he was accused of having purchased land in Markham, Ontario in 1969 while the Cabinet was considering development plans in the area. Bales offered to resign from cabinet but his resignation was refused. The incidents resulted in Davis issuing the province's first conflict of interest guidelines for cabinet ministers and later parliamentary assistants to follow.

He was dropped from cabinet in 1974 during a major cabinet shuffle. Bales cited declining health and a minor heart attack in 1973 as the reasons for requesting a reduction in his responsibilities. He left politics the next year to return to his legal practice.

Cabinet posts

Later life
Bales died at the age of 59 when he was struck by a car while attempting to cross Bayview Avenue in Toronto.

References

External links

Dalton A. Bales fonds, Archives of Ontario

1920 births
1979 deaths
Attorneys General of Ontario
Lawyers in Ontario
Members of the Executive Council of Ontario
People from North York
Politicians from Toronto
Progressive Conservative Party of Ontario MPPs
20th-century Canadian lawyers